1961 in Korea may refer to:
1961 in North Korea
1961 in South Korea